Pyrvinium (Viprynium) is an anthelmintic effective for pinworms. Several forms of pyrvinium have been prepared with variable counter anions, such as halides, tosylate, triflate and pamoate.  Pyrvinium was identified as a potent Wnt inhibitor, acting through activation of Casein kinase CK1α.

Pyrvinium salts can also inhibit the growth of cancer cells. More specifically, the pamoate salt has been shown to have preferential toxicity for various cancer cell lines during glucose starvation.

Synthesis

One synthetic method is based on Skraup synthesis and Paal-Knorr synthesis. More recently, an alternative convergent, synthetic strategy to pyrvinium triflate salts through Friedländer synthesis was reported.

References 

Anthelmintics
Pyrroles
Quinolines
Quaternary ammonium compounds